Mobility Carsharing (officially Mobility Cooperative, also known as Mobility Car Sharing or simply Mobility for short) is a Swiss cooperative of carsharing. 
It covers almost all organised carsharing in Switzerland. 
Mobility offers 2,930 vehicles at 1,500 sites and 200 scooters in Zurich for private customers as well as for companies.

As of 2017, Mobility has 177,100 customers, of which 66,800 are members of the cooperative. The company employs a workforce of 224 staff and generates a turnover of CHF 76 million. 
It is the most important car sharing company in Switzerland.

History 
Mobility was founded in 1997 with the merger of the two Swiss car sharing cooperatives AutoTeilet-Genossenschaft (ATG) and ShareCom. These predecessor companies were both founded in 1987, ATG in Stans and ShareCom in Zurich. The two began cooperating as early on as 1991, each enabling their members to use the other's vehicles. That same year they were both involved in setting up the association European Car Sharing (ECS). In 1996, ATG took over the Geneva-based cooperative CopAuto (founded in 1993). ShareCom developed the first on-board computers in the same year.

Mobility CarSharing was formed from the merger between ATG and ShareCom in 1997: its registered headquarters were in Zurich and it had 17’400 customers and 760 vehicles. After this, the reservation system underwent technological refinement: the vehicles were fitted with on-board computers and members were issued with a chip card (Mobility Card). Online reservations were introduced, too. These expensive technical facilities imposed a considerable financial burden on the company and a restructuring programme was initiated in the year 2000.
Since then, Mobility has continuously increased its number of cooperative members and customers as well as adding more vehicles and sites. A range of cooperative ventures have been launched or expanded. In 2013 Mobility received the GfM award from the Swiss Marketing Association.

As of 1 October 2007 the company's registered headquarters was moved to Lucerne, where the cooperative's operational centre was already located. The company will relocate their headquarter to Rotkreuz ZG by 2018.

Fleet 

Mobility operates more than 2,930 vehicles at 1,500 sites and 200 e-scooter in Zurich.

The vehicle fleet comprises ordinary vehicles in ten categories, ranging from frugal compact cars, convertibles and light vans to e-scooter. Their striking red colour is the company's main hallmark, making the vehicles clearly recognizable throughout Switzerland. One of the key considerations for Mobility's vehicle management programme is sustainability: according to the company itself, its entire fleet achieves emissions averaging 97 g /km. This puts Mobility 33% below Switzerland's mandatory threshold as applicable from 2015.

How the system works 

Mobility offers 24 hours availability, and charges by hour and km traveled, with a minimum charging period of 30 minutes. 
Vehicles are reserved online via the mobile app or website, or by telephone. The reservation of the vehicle is confirmed in real time. Certain vehicle types are fitted so that they can be operated entirely without a key. 

Once the vehicle has been returned, the on-board computer once again relays the trip details via email or text message for invoicing purposes. Fees are charged based on the number of kilometres travelled and the duration of use. The fee includes all costs for fuel, motor insurance, tax, maintenance and depreciation.

Stations 

Mobility primarily locates its vehicles at railways stations and in conurbations. This is due to the fact that it collaborates with various public transportation companies so as to provide interconnected mobility services. As a result, more than 40 per cent of Mobility cars are situated at railway stations of the Swiss Federal Railways. The aim here is to dovetail public transportation with car travel.

Offers 
Mobility aims its subscriptions and offers at various target groups. The company launched its "Learner driver subscription" programme in 2013 for learner drivers and inexperienced motorists, for example. A similar programme is "Student subscription" (since 2014) for students. Private customers can become cooperative members or take out annual/trial subscriptions and benefit from additional advantages. Furthermore, they can register without subscription fees or obligations for "Click & Drive".

Mobility offers two different products in the area of corporate mobility. "Business Car Sharing" allows companies to make use of Mobility cars – whether on a one-off basis or using exclusively reserved vehicles at the company's headquarters. Meanwhile, "Mobility Pool Car Sharing" involves existing corporate fleets being equipped with car sharing technology, thereby allowing a system of car sharing to be operated within the company. Other services such as claims management and maintenance are likewise integrated in the programme. A number of companies have outsourced their vehicle fleets to Mobility, either completely or partially. These include Migros (since 1998) and ABB.

Environment 
According to an Interface study, 22% of private customers and 50% of business customers would buy their own car if Mobility did not exist. This would mean there would be around 27'600 more vehicles on Switzerland's roads, needing 41'400 parking spaces. The study also shows that car sharing has a positive impact on energy consumption: it leads to a reduction in  emissions of 20’500 tonnes per year. Mobility has its annual business and sustainability report audited by the Global Reporting Initiative and achieved Application Level B in 2014.

Cooperative ventures 
Mobility collaborates with various public transport companies: these provide parking spaces at railway stations and promote offers involving combined transport such as the Swiss Federal Railways, universities and companies.

Mobility also collaborates with the rental car companies Hertz (1996) and  Europcar (2016), which offer Mobility members reduced rental rates.

Subsidiaries 
Through its subsidiary Mobility Systems + Services (founded in 2001 as Mobility Support AG), Mobility markets its booking system MobiSys 2.0, which it developed itself, as well as its expertise in the fields of fleet management and marketing.

In 2014 Mobility launched Switzerland's first free-floating car sharing programme called "Catch a Car" in Basel. Members can locate Catch-Cars via smartphone or on the website and drive from A to B without making a reservation in advance. Catch a Car is currently going through a two-year pilot phase. ETH Zurich is conducting a scientific investigation into how Catch a Car impacts on the mobility behaviour of individual members.

References 

Carsharing
Cooperatives in Switzerland
Transport companies of Switzerland